The Mount Augustus spiny-tailed gecko (Strophurus wilsoni), also known commonly as the Mount Augustus striped gecko and Wilson's spiny-tailed gecko,  is a species of lizard in the family Diplodactylidae. The species is endemic to Australia.

Etymology
The specific name, wilsoni, is in honor of Australian herpetologist Stephen Karl "Steve" Wilson.

Geographic range
S. wilsoni is found in western Western Australia.

Habitat
The natural habitat of S. wilsoni is shrubland.

Reproduction
S. wilsoni is oviparous.

References

Further reading
Cogger H (2014). Reptiles and Amphibians of Australia, Seventh Edition. Clayton, Victoria, Australia: CSIRO Publishing. xxx + 1,033 pp. .
Ellis RJ, Doughty P, Bauer AM (2018). "An annotated type catalogue of the geckos and pygopods (Squamata: Gekkota: Carphodactylidae, Diplodactylidae, Gekkonidae, Pygopodidae) in the collection of the Western Australian Museum". Records of the Western Australian Museum 33: 051–094.
Rösler H (2000). "Kommentierte Liste der rezent, subrezent und fossil bekannten Geckotaxa (Reptilia: Gekkonomorpha)". Gekkota 2: 28–153. (Strophurus wilsoni, p. 115). (in German).
Storr GM (1983). "Two new lizards from Western Australia (genera Diplodactylus and Lerista)". Rec. Western Australian Mus. 11 (1): 59–62. (Diplodactylus wilsoni, new species).
Wilson, Steve; Swan, Gerry (2013). A Complete Guide to Reptiles of Australia, Fourth Edition. Sydney: New Holland Publishers. 522 pp. .

Strophurus
Geckos of Australia
Reptiles described in 1983
Taxa named by Glen Milton Storr